Arifat is a commune of the Tarn department in southern France.

The inhabitants are known as Arifatois.

Geography
The commune is traversed by the river Dadou.

Demographics

Places of interest
 Arifat's castle
 Waterfall

See also
Communes of the Tarn department

References

Communes of Tarn (department)